Professor Phillip Brown (born 21 April 1957), a British sociologist of education, economy and social change, is Distinguished Research Professor in the School of Social Sciences at Cardiff University. He is a prominent modern sociologist and currently the author of seventeen books (five published by Oxford University Press and six translated into foreign languages) and over 100 articles and reports. Since 2005 he has given keynote presentation in over 17 counties around the world, including the World Bank in Washington and International Labour Organization in Geneva and EU in Brussels.

Biography 

Phillip, born in 1957, was brought up in Oxfordshire in the UK. He started his working life as an apprentice at the British Leyland car factory in Cowley, Oxford, before going to college to study Sociology. He received his PhD at Swansea University, Wales, his thesis on social class, education and the transition to employment in a period of high youth unemployment was later published as Schooling Ordinary Kids (1987). He was then appointed as a post-doc researcher at the Cambridge Institute of Criminology from 1985 to 1987 followed by a lectureship in Industrial Sociology at the University of Kent (1987–97). He became a Reader in Sociology at Kent before moving to the School of Social Sciences, Cardiff University in 1997. Since 1997 to present Phillip has remained at Cardiff University as a Distinguished Research Professor.

Academic work 

Phillip's current research Interests include, rethinking human capital theory, education, technology and the future of Work, sociology of talent and global talent market, education, social stratification and the prospects for social mobility, the positional competition and social congestion theory and finally the future of skill formation and the global division of labour

Generally he explores the transformation of education, employment and labour markets since the rise of neo-liberalism in the 1970s, including empirical studies of education, employment and social stratification in Britain, alongside comparative studies of skills and the global division of labour in China, France, Germany, India, Korea, Singapore, the United States and more. He's been a visiting professor at the University of British Columbia, Sciences Po in Paris, and the University of Turku. Phillip is currently a visiting professor at the Centre for Skills, Performance and Productivity Research, Institute for Adult Learning/Workforce Development Agency, Singapore and a Distinguished Visiting Professor, Zhengzhou University, China. Phillip is currently leading a review of the 'Digital Innovation for the Economy and the Future of Work in Wales'.

Books

Volumes & Translated Books

References

External links 

 Cardiff University Profile

Living people
1957 births
British sociologists
Academics of Cardiff University
Alumni of Swansea University
Sociologists of education